The 1803 Tennessee gubernatorial election took place from August 4–5, 1803. In 1801 Sevier was forced leave office as he had reached his three consecutive term limit and in 1803 ran against the incumbent governor, Roane, and defeated him with 57.93% of the vote. This was the first gubernatorial election that did not unanimously elect a governor.

Results

References

1803 Tennessee elections
1803
Tennessee